Dark Hazard is 1934 pre-Code film American drama film starring Edward G. Robinson and directed by Alfred E. Green. It is based on a novel by W. R. Burnett. It was produced by First National Pictures and released through Warner Bros.

Robinson is a compulsive gambler with a come-and-go knack for picking winners. After failing at a succession of regular jobs, he becomes involved with the sport of greyhound racing; "Dark Hazard" is the name of a particular dog he takes a fancy to.

A copy is held at the Library of Congress and the Wisconsin Center for Film and Theatre Research. It has been preserved by Warner Bros. and was released on Region 1 DVD on November 18, 2014 as part of the "Forbidden Hollywood, Volume 8" collection. It also airs occasionally on Turner Classic Movies.

Cast
 Edward G. Robinson as Jim "Buck" Turner
 Genevieve Tobin as Marge Mayhew
 Glenda Farrell as Valerie Wilson
 Robert Barrat as Tex Willis
 Hobart Cavanaugh as George Mayhew
 Gordon Westcott as Joe
 Sidney Toler as John Bright
 War Cry as Dark Hazard
 George Meeker as Pres. Barrow
 Emma Dunn as Mrs. Mayhew
 Willard Robertson as Fallen
 William V. Mong as Mr. Plummer
 Henry B. Walthall as Schultz

References

External links
 
 
 
 

1934 films
Films based on American novels
Films based on works by W. R. Burnett
Films directed by Alfred E. Green
First National Pictures films
1934 drama films
American drama films
American black-and-white films
1930s American films